Frank J. Zappala (May 24, 1898 – January 8. 1988) was an American politician and lawyer.

Zappala was born in Italy. He received his bachelor's degree from Duquesne University and his law degree from Duquesne University School of Law in Pennsylvania. Zappala was a lawyer. He served in the Pennsylvania House of Representatives from 1935 to 1939, from Allegheny County, Pennsylvania, and was a Democrat. Zappala served as a magistrate for the city of Pittsburgh from 1939 to 1950. Zappala ran for election to the Pennsylvania State Senate in 1950 and lost the election. He died in Pleasant Hill, Pennsylvania.

Notes

1898 births
1988 deaths
Italian emigrants to the United States
People from Allegheny County, Pennsylvania
Duquesne University alumni
Duquesne University School of Law alumni
Pennsylvania lawyers
Democratic Party members of the Pennsylvania House of Representatives
American people of Italian descent